Georgiana Morson was a British social reformer. She served as a matron for Urania Cottage, a house for what were then called "fallen women" (prostitutes) founded by Charles Dickens and Angela Burdett-Coutts, as well as the Foundling Hospital during the mid-nineteenth century.

Personal life 
Georgiana Collin was born in Merton. She married James Morson, a doctor for St George's Hospital, in 1838. Shortly after their marriage, James Morson was appointed as Chief Medical Officer for the Brazilian National Mining Association. He died in 1848, leaving Georgiana with three children to provide for by her own efforts.

In 1854, Morson would resign from her post as matron of Urania Cottage in order to marry George Wade Harrison, a printer and bookseller, and they settled in Sevenoaks.

Urania Cottage 

On 26 May 1846, Dickens wrote Burdett-Coutts a lengthy letter stating his desire to open an asylum for girls and women working in London's streets as prostitutes. The letter included planning for the asylum ranging from finding a property in London to a detailed process of rehabilitating fallen women. For example, Dickens suggests introducing a marks system and probationary period for asylum residents. He writes: It is explained to her that she is degraded and fallen, but not lost, having this shelter; and that the means of Return to Happiness are now about to be put into her own hands, and trusted to her own keeping. That with this view, she is, instead of being placed in this probationary class for a month, or two months, or three months, or any specified time whatever, required to earn there, a certain number of Marks (they are mere scratches in a book) so that she may make her probation a very short one, or a very long one, according to her own conduct. For so much work, she has so many Marks; for a day's good conduct, so many more. For every instance of ill-temper, disrespect, bad language, any outbreak of any sort or kind, so many - a very large number in proportion to her receipts - are deducted. A perfect Debtor and Creditor account is kept between her and the Superintendent, for every day; and the state of that account, it is in her own power and nobody else's, to adjust to her advantage.

Dickens located a home for the asylum originally named Urania Cottage in Shepherd's Bush, Middlesex in 1847. He worked closely with Burdett-Coutts in the asylum founding and administration, regularly attending meetings and writing about the home in his journal, All the Year Round. Opening to residents in November 1847, the institution provided food, shelter, and a detailed daily routine for the residents. Residents learned to read and write, worked in the garden, completed all household tasks including needlework, attended singing lessons, and cooked food for local poor relief.

Georgiana Morson served as a dedicated matron of Urania Cottage from 1849 to 1854. In her book, Charles Dickens and the House of Fallen Women, Jenny Hartley describes how, "Georgiana Morson proved herself the best matron Urania ever had... she taught the girls to read and write, as well as all the household skills a servant needed. She presided over the dining table, and made mealtimes a social occasion the girls had not known before. They ate the good food she had taught them to cook and chattered about their future prospects." At the time she managed Urania Cottage, Morson was a widow with three children to support.

Dickens praised Morson's oversight at Urania Cottage in a letter recommending her as matron for the Foundling Hospital in 1852. Writing to the governors of the hospital on 9 July 1852, Dickens describes her "capacity for the administration of such an office." He goes on to explain that:She is a lady of great discretion, of remarkable sweetness of temper, and has a power of uniting firmness with conciliation in a very remarkable and uncommon manner. I have never known her to make a mistake even under circumstances of great difficulty, and I have invariably found that those under her care have become attached to her. She is accustomed to method, order, punctuality, and to a habit of sound and judicious observation. I would entrust her, myself, with the duties to which she now aspires, in preference to any lady I have ever seen in a similar capacity.

Morson resigned her position at Urania Cottage in order to remarry.

References 

British social reformers
Foundling Hospital
People from the London Borough of Merton
1817 births
Year of death missing